Class 5600 are a series of electric locomotives built by Siemens in association with Sorefame of Portugal for Comboios de Portugal, the state owned railway company of Portugal.

Overview
The 5600 locomotives predate the EuroSprinter family of modular locomotives built by Siemens for European railway companies, but have much in common with the later machines. Externally the locomotives are identical to Spain's Class 252 which were built at the same time, albeit without DC capability.

Accidents
Of the 30 locomotives that were originally bought, 5624 was severely damaged in an accident in 2003, and 5613 was also damaged in the Alfarelos train crash.

See also
Sorefame (Portuguese), Sociedades Reunidas de Fabricações Metálicas

References

External links

CP 5600 @ Trainspo

Siemens locomotives
Electric locomotives of Portugal
Railway locomotives introduced in 1993
Bo′Bo′ locomotives
5 ft 6 in gauge locomotives